Caledonia Township is a township in O'Brien County, Iowa in the United States.

History
Caledonia Township was founded in 1878.

References

Townships in O'Brien County, Iowa
Townships in Iowa